Stéphane Abrial (born 7 September 1954), is a French general who is the previous commander of Allied Command Transformation based in Norfolk, VA, one of the two NATO strategic commands. His previous posting was as the Chief of Staff of the French Air Force.

French military career

General Stéphane Abrial graduated in 1973 from the French Air Force academy (École de l'air), and in 1974 from the U.S. Air Force Academy. He completed pilot training at the French Air Force Academy in 1976.

From 1977 to 1991, he served as a fighter pilot both in France (in Cambrai, Dijon and Orange) and, from 1981 to 1984, in a West German Luftwaffe unit. In 1988, he assisted the Greek Air Force in converting its first unit equipped with the Mirage 2000.

In 1991, he took part in the first Gulf War as a fighter pilot and commander of the French Air Force's 5th Fighter Squadron. Later that year, he attended the Air War College, at Maxwell Air Force Base in Montgomery, Alabama.

From 1992 to 1996, he served in the staff of the French Air Force Chief of Staff and the Chief of Defense Staff. From 1996 to 1999, he served at NATO Headquarters, in Brussels. In 2000, he became deputy head of the French President's military staff, and in 2002 was appointed head of the French Prime Minister's military staff.

In 2005, General Abrial became head of the French Air Defense headquarters, in Taverny, and in 2006 Air Force Chief of Staff.

NATO Supreme Allied Commander

Gen. Stéphane Abrial received appointment by the North Atlantic Council as Supreme Allied Commander Transformation on 29 July 2009, the first European to be appointed permanently as head of a NATO strategic command.

In April 2010, he received a Distinguished Leadership Award from the Atlantic Council.

Major military awards

Grand Officer of the Légion d'honneur (France)
Officer of the Ordre national du Mérite (France)
Croix de guerre des TOE with one silver-gilt star (France)
Croix du Combattant (France)
Médaille de l'Aéronautique (France)
Overseas Medal with two bars (France)
Legion of Merit, Commander (USA)
Bundeswehr Cross of Honour in Silver (Germany)
German Sports Badge (Military version in Bronze)
Order of Abdulaziz al Saud, First Class (Saudi Arabia)
Kuwait Liberation Medal (Saudi Arabia)
Kuwait Liberation Medal (Kuwait)
Grand Officer of the Order of Aeronautical Merit (Brazil)
Santos-Dumont Medal of Merit, Brazilian Air Force
Cross of Naval Merit, White Grand Cross (Spain)
NATO Meritorious Service Medal
Commemorative Medal of the Chief of General Staff of the Slovak Armed Forces in gold
Order of the Crown, Grand Cross (Belgium)
Order of Merit of the Republic of Poland, Commander's Cross
Order of Merit of the Federal Republic of Germany, Commander's Cross (7 September 2015)

Civilian career
Since July 2015, Abrial has been senior executive vice president of international and public affairs of Safran.

Since February 2014, Abrial has also been chairman of the board of directors of the Musée de l’air et de l’espace Paris, since April 2013, director of the Atlantic Council, and, since December 2013, member of the advisory board of the Aspen Institute France.

Notes

|-

|-

Atlantic Council
1954 births
Living people
People from Gers
French Air Force generals
Grand Officiers of the Légion d'honneur
Officers of the Ordre national du Mérite
Recipients of the Croix de guerre des théâtres d'opérations extérieures
Recipients of the Aeronautical Medal
Commanders of the Legion of Merit
Recipients of the Badge of Honour of the Bundeswehr
Commanders of the Order of Merit of the Republic of Poland
Commanders Crosses of the Order of Merit of the Federal Republic of Germany
Grand Crosses of Naval Merit
Grand Crosses of the Order of the Crown (Belgium)
French military personnel of the Gulf War
Chiefs of the Staff of the French Air and Space Force
École de l'air alumni